"More Than a Woman" is a song recorded by American singer Aaliyah for her eponymous third and final studio album (2001). It was written by Static Major and Timbaland, and produced by the latter. A pop, electro, hip hop and funk song, it was one of three records Timbaland produced for Aaliyah and features digital strings, harsh-sounding synthetic bass, and guitar sounds. Lyrically, the song expresses a female protagonist's promise to be "more than a woman" to her love interest.

In August 2001, in support of the then-upcoming single release of "More Than a Woman", Aaliyah filmed the song's accompanying music video, directed by Dave Meyers, and then travelled to the Bahamas to shoot a video for "Rock the Boat". However, after its completion, she and several crew members who were returning to the United States died in a plane crash on August 25. Although Blackground Records executives were initially uncertain when they would issue the physical single and its accompanying video, "More Than a Woman" was released as the third and final single from Aaliyah on September 4.

A commercial success, "More Than a Woman" reached number one on the UK Singles Chart, becoming Aaliyah's only song to do so, while reaching the top ten in Croatia and Scotland. The song was not commercially released in the US, therefore experiencing moderate success and peaking at number 25 on the Billboard Hot 100. To promote Aaliyah, Aaliyah performed the song on Live with Regis and Kelly and The Tonight Show with Jay Leno, latter of which was her final performance. Critically acclaimed, "More Than a Woman" was nominated for Best Female R&B Vocal Performance at the 45th Annual Grammy Awards (2003).

Background and composition
"More Than a Woman" was written by Stephen "Static Major" Garrett and Timothy "Timbaland" Mosley, being produced by the latter. Conceived during the recording of Aaliyah, the song was initially produced by Garrett. After recording its original version, Garrett kept going back and listening to the song, saying "I can do something bigger and better to it". Subsequently, he rewrote the whole song. Aaliyah wasn't present at the studio when Garrett recorded the original, so she never heard it.

It is an "anthemic, 80s-tinged" song, and according to Complex journalist Lauren Nostro it mixes "pop, electro, and a mesmerizing mid tempo hip-hop feel, which allowed Aaliyah's delicate vocals to take the spotlight". While, i-D journalist Emily Manning states that the song has a "daring" blend of pop and electronic influences. In a review of Aaliyah, Ian Wade from Dotmusic described the song as "Baroque liquid funk", and Jeff Lorenz from Yahoo! Music described it as "breezy hip-hop/funk". Harrison Brocklehust from The Tab declared that the song is "one of the greatest R&B singles to ever be released".
 Micha Frazer-Carroll from The Independent stated, "Even at her most poppy, “More Than a Woman” includes smooth and sweet self-harmonisation amid dark, minor-key strings". Although the song implements a variety of sounds, it also contains an initially-uncredited sample from the Arabic song "Alouli Ansa" by Syrian singer Mayada El Hennawy. Vocally, Aaliyah "sings breathily and economically" over the song's "grinding electronic backdrop, and a coda of dirty, squelchy synths". She makes "it look deceptively simple the way her understated vocals cut through a glitchy, complex Timbaland beat to take center stage". The song "creeps up on you, its charms gradually revealing themselves through Aaliyah's understated delivery". Lyrically, she is professing that she "has everything her man is looking for, silencing his need to look further".

Release and promotion
Having invested in the commercial performance of Aaliyah, Blackground Records and Virgin Records wanted a single with a high chart peak to help increase the album's sales. Its lead single "We Need a Resolution" had been released on April 13, 2001, but underperformed on radio and reached only number 59 on the US  Billboard Hot 100. Originally, "More Than a Woman" was chosen as the second single; however, "Rock the Boat" began receiving heavy radio airplay. Despite its radio success, Blackground didn't want "Rock the Boat" to be released as a single, instead campaigning for Timbaland-produced songs, including "More Than a Woman". Aaliyah fought with the label and pushed for "Rock the Boat" to become the second single. Consequently, Blackground and Virgin serviced "Rock the Boat" to rhythmic contemporary radio in the United States as the second single from Aaliyah on August 21. It was released in the UK in January 2002, debuting at number 1 the week after release.

In August, Aaliyah filmed the accompanying music video for "More Than a Woman" in Los Angeles and then travelled to the Bahamas to film a video for "Rock the Boat". However, after its completion, she and several crew members who were returning to the US died in a plane crash on August 25. Although Blackground executives were initially uncertain when they would release the album's next single and video, "More Than a Woman" was released as the second international single from the album on September 4, and as the airplay-only third and final US single on April 30, 2002.

In August 2021, it was reported that Aaliyah's recorded work for Blackground (since rebranded as Blackground Records 2.0) would be re-released on physical, digital, and, for the first time ever, streaming services in a deal between the label and Empire Distribution. Aaliyah, including "More Than a Woman", was re-released on September 10.

Live performances
Aaliyah first performed "More Than a Woman" on Live with Regis and Kelly on July 18, 2001, to promote Aaliyah. The second and final performance of the song took place on The Tonight Show with Jay Leno on July 25; it was Aaliyah's final live performance before she died a month later.

Critical reception
James Poletti from Dotmusic gave "More Than a Woman" a mixed review; he praised the song's production by saying it was one of Timbaland's finest productions but felt that the song was lesser compared to Aaliyah's previously released singles. Overall, he felt that the song did justice to Aaliyah's legacy and that it "reminds us that Aaliyah was a truly contemporary soul performer and will be sorely missed". In a review of Aaliyah, Luke McManus from the Irish publication RTÉ compared "More Than a Woman" to the work of French electronic music duo Daft Punk and praised her vocal performance. When reviewing Aaliyah, British publication NME described "More Than a Woman" as being "grandiose". Brad Cawn from Chicago Tribune felt that Aaliyah had matured content-wise and described the song as being a "mid-tempo come-on".

Sal Cinquemani from Slant Magazine felt that the song would make the perfect cartoon theme song, stating: "If the beyond-burgeoning actress was ever approached to play a cartoon superhero, the synth-heavy "More Than a Woman", with its millennium-ready empowerment and sensitive vocals, would make the perfect theme song for the fictional vixen ("You go, I go/'Cause we share pillows")". Joshua Clover from Spin praised the song by saying: "'More Than a Woman' isn't the Bee Gees song but pushes the jumpy tune until, finally, it meets you in the doorway (or is that the dance floor or the bed room?)". Quentin B. Huff from PopMatters praised the production of the song by saying: "The production bumps and jerks, contrasting a smooth groove with the spikes and dips of its loops and cadences". He also felt that "Aaliyah manages to croon over this mechanical bull of a beat, and the lyrics are appropriately terse and frugal, as if she only needs a few key phrases to remind her significant other that she is in fact "more than enough for you."

Accolades

Commercial performance
In the United States, "More Than a Woman" entered the Billboard Hot 100 chart at number 71 on February 2, 2002. It peaked at number 25 in its ninth week, spending a total of 24 weeks on the chart. It also peaked at number 11 on Dance Club Songs during its sixth week on the chart, while peaking at number seven on Hot R&B/Hip-Hop Songs in its 24th week. On June 15, "More Than a Woman" peaked at number 19 on the Mainstream Top 40. It also peaked at number 12 on the Rhythmic chart on April 27. "More Than a Woman" was ranked at number 58 on the 2002 year-end Billboard Hot 100.

Internationally, "More Than a Woman" peaked at number 12 on the European Hot 100 Singles on January 26. In Belgium, "More Than a Woman" peaked at number ten on the Ultratip chart in Flanders, as well as at number 31 on the Ultratop 50 in Wallonia. In France, the song was released as a double A-side single with "I Refuse", peaking at number 25. In Germany, the song peaked at number 34. In Ireland, "More Than a Woman" peaked at number 13 on January 31. In the Netherlands, it entered the Dutch Top 40 at number 33 on November 21, 2001, peaking at number 29 four weeks later. On November 10, the song peaked and spent two weeks at number 38 on the Dutch Single Top 100. In Scotland, the song peaked at number ten on January 13, 2002. The song debuted at number 25 in Switzerland on November 11, 2001, reaching it peak at number 16 in its 11th week, on January 20, 2002.

In the United Kingdom, "More Than a Woman" debuted and peaked at number one on the UK Singles Chart for the week ending date January 19, 2002, selling 32,081 copies in its first week. It became the first time that a posthumous release had taken over from another posthumous release in the country, when the song was replaced by George Harrison's "My Sweet Lord", and the first time that a woman had had a posthumous number-one single. According to the 
Official Charts Company (OCC), "More Than a Woman" is Aaliyah's second best-selling single in the UK, behind "Try Again". In Australia, the song peaked at number 37 on March 10.

Music video

Background
 
The accompanying music video for "More Than a Woman" was directed by Dave Meyers and was filmed in Los Angeles in August 2001, before the video shoot for "Rock the Boat". Meyers was chosen as the director for the video when Aaliyah met him through Damon Dash. According to Meyers, "She was with Damon Dash, her boyfriend I think, or at least they were friendly. Damon was hiring me for a lot of Jay Z's videos. I think that might've been the way I got into that job. I don't remember exactly. I just remember Damon telling me I better make his girlfriend look good [laughs]".

After getting to know one another, Meyers became familiar with Aaliyah's artistic side. He explained: "I was really impressed with how balanced she was on her whole deal and really had a great understanding of all sides of the artistic equation. She was pulling tears out of magazines and sharing those with me, it was a little bit more of how she wanted to present herself and I built the world around her with the motorcycle and the lights and the dance". The budget for the video was high, which made Myers nervous because "he wanted everything to go as planned, including the light show for the video". Aaliyah, who got the budget approved for the video, also wanted to make sure the light show was included; Myers recalled Aaliyah saying "No, I want to do this right" when speaking about the budget.

Theme
The theme for the video was brainstormed at a "little" round table; some ideas drafted included the light show and the motorcycle theme. Myers stated: "I was really excited about the video so I sort of did a little roundtable. The light show was something I've been wanting to do ever since Lenny Kravitz's "Are You Gonna Go My Way", and then the motorcycle motif I think one of the younger guys had initially tossed it out there and I thought it was awesome". The motorcycle theme was taken from the ″motorcycle mania″, heavily prominent with the hip hop crew The Ruff Ryders around that time. The video's theme included a lot of metaphorical aspects, especially within the motorcycle (e.g. the energy from the dance routines is fueling the motorcycle throughout the video).

Fashion
Aaliyah wore a custom-made Chanel jumpsuit created by designer Dapper Dan in the video. Aaliyah's stylist Derek Lee stated: "Aaliyah looked so good in a catsuit and we wanted it to be designer. He took the idea and he ran with it. It's pretty amazing". Meanwhile, Aaliyah's backup dancers wore faux Chanel buckle belts purchased on Canal Street, "where they would sell really random knockoff things". Their shoes were regular sneakers Lee made into Chanel ones to coordinate with their outfits.

Synopsis

The video starts with a shot of West 4th Street in Los Angeles, looking towards the Westin Bonaventure Hotel and Aaliyah riding a 2001 model Triumph Speed Triple, wearing a helmet and a Dainese jumpsuit. The camera zooms inside the exhaust pipe and shows Aaliyah dancing in a white Chanel catsuit with other female dancers between the pistons. Between cuts, she is seen riding the motorcycle and doing wheelies, and in another scene standing in front of a headlight with her back against the camera. Later in the video, the video shifts to a higher, nightclub-styled floor of the motorcycle above the pistons, where Aaliyah is wearing leather pants, gloves, and boots and a black tank-top, and dances with co-ed dancers. British music producer Mark Ronson appears in the club as a DJ, along with then-girlfriend Rashida Jones and her sister Kidada. Various dancers are then shown dancing across the floor, culminating in Aaliyah and the female dancers doing a towel dance at the end of the song. At the end, Aaliyah is seen on the motorcycle, removing her helmet. The final shot is a silhouette of her in front of sunrise with the words "In Loving Memory of Aaliyah" above.

Reception
The music video for "More Than a Woman" made its television debut on BET, MTV, and VH1 during the week ending January 14, 2002. During the week ending February 3, the video was the second most-played video on BET. For the week ending February 24, the video was the 26th most-played video on MTV.

Quentin B. Huff from PopMatters compared the video to the work of both Michael Jackson and Janet Jackson, saying: "Aaliyah's dancing in her videos probably owed a debt to the videos for Michael and Janet Jackson's solo work. No doubt that's true of many artists. Actually, the "More Than a Woman" video brings to mind Michael and Janet's "Scream" video, as well as Janet's video for "Rhythm Nation." He also praised her dancing in the video for being "effortless". Rolling Stone praised the video "for adding a touch of vibrant color to its futuristic factory setting". Les Fabian Brathwaite from Out felt that this was "maybe" Aaliyah's best video ; He also praised the videos wardrobe styling and choreography.

Legacy
In 2017, Welsh musician Kelly Lee Owens covered "More Than a Woman" in two different versions. The tracks were released on a limited-edition 12-inch vinyl and were made available via SoundCloud. Owens stated: "My love and respect for Aaliyah as an artist/vocalist and Timbaland as a producer increased tenfold as I picked the track apart and understood how intricate and layered everything was", adding: "The remix of my cover was something I wanted to write and produce that gave the original track new life, and also gave people a sense of power — it’s unapologetic."

American singer Kehlani interpolated "More Than a Woman" on the song "Too Much" from her debut studio album SweetSexySavage (2017). Canadian rapper Drake interpolated the opening verse of "More Than a Woman" into the song "Is There More" from his fifth studio album Scorpion (2018).

Track listings and formats

International maxi CD single
 "More Than a Woman" (album version) – 3:48
 "More Than a Woman" (Bump n' Flex club mix) – 5:28
 "More Than a Woman" (Masters at Work main mix) – 8:47
 "More Than a Woman" (music video) – 3:43

European CD single
 "More Than a Woman" (album version) – 3:47
 "One in a Million" – 4:30

European maxi CD single
 "More Than a Woman" (album version) – 3:47
 "More Than a Woman" (Bump N' Flex club mix) – 5:29
 "One in a Million" – 4:30
 "More Than a Woman" (music video) – 3:43

European 12-inch vinyl
 "More Than a Woman" (album version) – 3:47
 "More Than a Woman" (instrumental) – 3:47
 "More Than a Woman" (Bump N' Flex club mix) – 5:29
 "More Than a Woman" (Bump N' Flex dub mix) – 5:07

UK 12-inch vinyl and cassette single
 "More Than a Woman" (album version) – 3:48
 "More Than a Woman" (Bump N' Flex club mix) – 5:28
 "More Than a Woman" (Masters at Work main mix) – 8:47

French CD single
 "More Than a Woman" (album version) – 3:47
 "I Refuse" – 5:57

Australian maxi CD single
 "More Than a Woman" (radio edit) – 3:08
 "Rock the Boat" (album version) – 4:34
 "More Than a Woman" (Bump N' Flex club mix) – 5:28
 "More Than a Woman" (Masters at Work main mix) – 8:47

Credits and personnel
Credits are adapted from the liner notes of Aaliyah.
 Aaliyah – vocals
 Jimmy Douglass – engineering, mixing
 Steve Penny – engineering assistance
 Static Major – writing
 Timbaland – mixing, production, writing
 Michael Zainer – engineering assistance

Charts

Weekly charts

Year-end charts

Certifications

Release history

See also
 List of UK R&B Singles Chart number ones of 2002
 List of UK Singles Chart number ones of the 2000s
 List of posthumous number ones on the UK Singles Chart

References

Bibliography

External links
 
 
 Official website

2001 singles
2002 singles
Aaliyah songs
Music videos directed by Dave Meyers (director)
UK Singles Chart number-one singles
Song recordings produced by Timbaland
Songs with feminist themes
Songs written by Timbaland
Songs written by Static Major
2001 songs
Blackground Records singles
Electro songs